Jack Woolley may refer to:
 Jack Woolley (footballer)
 Jack Woolley (taekwondo)
 Jack Woolley (The Archers)

See also
 John Woolley (disambiguation)